The Ohrid Choir Festival is a choir festival in Ohrid, North Macedonia. Traditionally, the festival is held in the second half of August.  The participants are mainly from European countries.

The Festival has five sections:
"Open air" performances (required)
Competition
Folk music
Sacred music
Pop music

References

External links
Ohrid Choir Festival web site 
Ohrid Choir Festival 2008 Choir Kantilena from Veliko Trnovo, Bulgaria- YouTube

Choral festivals
Ohrid
Classical music festivals in North Macedonia
Summer events in North Macedonia